The Karoo dainty frog (Cacosternum karooicum) is a species of frog in the family Pyxicephalidae.
It is endemic to South Africa.
Its natural habitats are subtropical or tropical dry shrubland, intermittent rivers, intermittent freshwater marshes, rocky areas, and ponds.

References

Cacosternum
Endemic amphibians of South Africa
Taxonomy articles created by Polbot
Amphibians described in 2002